David L. Turpin is an American orthodontist who was the editor-in chief for The Angle Orthodontist from 1988 to 1999 and American Journal of Orthodontics and Dentofacial Orthopedics from 1999 to 2010.

Life
He received his dental degree from University of Iowa College of Dentistry in 1962 and his master's degree in orthodontics from University of Washington School of Dentistry in 1966.  He worked in private practice for more than 37 years of his life along with being on the clinical faculty in the orthodontic department at the University of Washington. This education when combined with clinical teaching opened a number of opportunities in serving the specialty of orthodontics. While a young man in the early years of practice, Turpin was appointed by the president of the American Society of Orthodontists to be one of 8 members to represent the Pacific Coast Society of orthodontists in making the organization more "user friendly" to new and younger members. Although this effort was a well-meaning attempt by the national president to involve young members, it failed to make many useful changes in the larger organization. With this background of association activity, Turpin was able to become editor of the Bulletin of the Pacific Coast Society of Orthodontists (1976–1988), a regional journal serving orthodontists on the West Coast. This journalistic experience allowed Turpin to move up to a more broadly respected publication, The Angle Orthodontist, where he served on the board and was the editor from 1988 to 1999. He then became editor-in-chief the American Journal of Orthodontics & Dentofacial Orthopedics, serving from 1999 to 2011. He was also called upon to serve as its interim editor in chief from 2013 to 2014 when Dr. Vince Kokich died unexpectedly. Turpin served one 5-year term on the executive committee of the World Federation of Orthodontists (2010–2015). He is a diplomate of the ABO and member of College of Diplomates of the American Board of Orthodontics. Additional positions held in the Department of Orthodontics at the University of Washington included being named the Moore/Riedel Professor from 2010 until 2019. He has recently retired from teaching.

Turpin is married to Judith Clark Turpin and have three children together.

Awards
 Omicron Kappa Upsilon
 Mosby Book Award 1962
 Milo Hellman Award 1967
 Golden Pencil Award (PCSO Bulletin) Internatn'l College 1980 & 89
 Golden Scroll Award (PCSO Bulletin) Internatn'l College, 1985 
 Annual Session Honoree, Pacific Coast Society of Ortho – 1988
 Golden Scroll Award (Angle Orthodontist) Internatn'l College, 1990
 Award of Merit, Pacific Coast Society of Orthodontists – 1991
 First Place – 2001 TRENDS Association Award, Scientific Pub 
 Platinum Citation – 2002 (AJO-DO) Internatn’l College of Dentists
 AAOF Jacob A. Salzmann Award – 2006
 Gold Category 3 – 2005 TRENDS Assoc Award, Scientific Pub 
 James A Brophy Award—2007
 Lifetime Achievement Award – 2011, PCSO 
 Dale B Wade Award of Excellence in Orthodontics – 2012
 The Albert H. Ketcham Memorial Award – 2015 
 Honorary Membership in Indian Orthodontic Society – 2015
 Honorary Scientific Advisor for WFO/ 9th International Orthodontic Congress, Yokohama, Japan

Positions held
 American Journal of Orthodontics and Dentofacial Orthopedics, editor-in-chief 1999–2011
 The Angle Orthodontist, editor-in-chief 1988–1999
 WFO Gazette, associate editor
 PSCO Bulletin, editor-in-chief 1975–1988
 AAO board of trustees, 2000–2010 and 2013–2014 ex officio member
 American Board of Orthodontics, diplomate
 Moore/Riedel Professor, U of Washington, Dept of Orthodontics, 2010–2019

Named lectures
 Jacob A Salzmann Lecture – 2006 AAOF, AAO Annual Session
 President's Lecture, Pacific Coast Society of Orthodontics – 2007 
 13th Professor Jose Rant Memorial Lecture – 2010, Slovenia
 Thirty-first Annual Alton W. Moore Lectureship – 2011, Seattle
 President's Lecture, Pacific Coast Society of Orthodontics – 2012
 Edward H Angle Lecture, AAO Annual Session – San Diego, 2017

References

American orthodontists
Medical journal editors
Living people
Year of birth missing (living people)
Place of birth missing (living people)